George Adams (January 26, 1855 - October 11, 1920) was an American professional baseball player who played for the 1879 Syracuse Stars.

References

External links

Syracuse Stars (NL) players
19th-century baseball players
Major League Baseball first basemen
Minor league baseball managers
Lynn Live Oaks players
Rhode Islands players
Syracuse Stars (minor league baseball) players
Baseball players from Worcester, Massachusetts
1855 births
1920 deaths